Parliamentary elections were held in Austria on 6 March 1966. The result was a victory for the Austrian People's Party (ÖVP), which won 85 of the 165 seats. Voter turnout was 94%.

During the campaign, ÖVP Chancellor Josef Klaus (who had succeeded Alfons Gorbach in 1964) had called for an end to the grand coalition with the Socialist Party of Austria (SPÖ) that had governed since 1945. The election results seemingly left Klaus free to break off the coalition; the ÖVP won an outright majority of three seats, enough to govern alone. However, Klaus reversed himself and proposed a new coalition agreement. The SPÖ leadership supported a renewed coalition, but talks failed when the SPÖ rank and file balked at the proposed coalition terms. Klaus then formed an exclusively ÖVP cabinet, the first one-party government of the Second Republic. It was also the first purely centre-right government in Austria since before World War II.

As of the 2019 elections, this is the only time in the ÖVP's history where it has governed in a majority. The ÖVP had won a majority of seats once before, during the first postwar election in 1945, but opted to lead a grand coalition rather than govern alone.

Results

References

Elections in Austria
Austria
Legislative
Austria